"Ocean Pearl" is a song by Canadian rock group 54-40. The song was released as the third single from the band's 1994 album, Smilin' Buddha Cabaret. The song was very successful in the band's native Canada, peaking at No. 22 on the RPM Top Singles chart. It is considered to be one of the band's signature songs.

References

External links

1994 singles
54-40 songs
1994 songs
Reprise Records singles